The Loire-Nieuport LN.40 aircraft were a family of French naval dive-bombers for the Aeronavale in the late 1930s, which saw service during World War II.

Design and development
Between 1932 and 1936, Nieuport-Delage had been developing a two-seat dive bomber, the Nieuport Ni.140, for the Aéronautique Navale, the aviation arm of the French Navy. It was renamed Loire-Nieuport LN.140 after the Nieuport company was absorbed into Loire-Nieuport, in 1933. The first of two prototypes, the LN.140-01, was flown on 12 March 1935, but had crashed in July during a forced landing, not being repaired. Flight testing continued with the second prototype, the LN.140-02, until development was abandoned after, that too, crashed in July 1936.

Development efforts were then concentrated on the LN.40 project which benefited from experience with the LN.140, but was a new, and aerodynamically more refined design, replacing the fixed and spatted undercarriage of the LN.140 with rearward retracting main gear legs, and dispensing with the second crewman. In the second half of 1937 an order was received for a prototype, followed by orders for seven production aircraft for the aircraft carrier Béarn and three more for operational evaluation by the air force. The French Air Force had expressed interest in a land-based derivative of the LN.40, designated the LN.41. Initial plans were for 184 to equip six dive bomber squadrons with 18 aircraft each, plus reserves.

The prototype made its first flight on 6 July 1938, the second followed in January 1939, and the third in May. Four of the pre-series LN.40 dive bombers were delivered in July, and it passed its carrier trials aboard the aircraft carrier Béarn. Nevertheless, the flight tests found that the dive brakes were ineffective, which led to their being removed in favour of using the extended landing gear doors as air brakes. The LN.40 also could not carry out diving attacks with full fuel tanks. The aircraft was too slow for the air force which requested the development of a faster dive bomber, which would become the Loire-Nieuport LN.42.

In July 1939, Loire-Nieuport had received orders for 36 LN.401 production dive bombers for the Navy, and 36 LN.411 aircraft for the Army. The LN.411 was almost identical to the LN.401, except for the deletion of the arrestor hook, the wing folding mechanism and the emergency floatation devices. The first LN.411s were delivered in September which coincided with an order from the air force for 270 more but in October they were refused, and the LN.411s were sent to the Navy.

Loire-Nieuport also attempted to develop a faster version, by substituting an  Hispano-Suiza 12Y-31 for the  Hispano-Suiza 12Xcrs engine of the LN.401. This LN.402 made its first flight on 18 November 1939. Further development of the LN.402 was prevented by the French defeat in May 1940 and the following armistice.

The final development was the LN.42 dispensed with the inverted gull wing and elevator endplates and used the much more powerful  Hispano-Suiza 12Y-51 engine but was too late for the Second World War, making only a few short hops before France fell during the 1940 invasion of France when it was hidden from the Germans for the duration of the war. Flight trials resumed on 24 August 1945 and ran until 1947, however no interest was forthcoming of the now obsolete type and only one example was built.

Operational history
Two escadrilles of the Aéronautique Navale, designated as AB2 and AB4, converted to the LN.401/411 between late 1939 and early 1940. AB2 received its first LN.401 dive bombers in November 1939, while AB4 received the LN.411 dive bombers rejected by the Air Force from February 1940 onwards. The dive bombers rejected by the Air Force were a welcome reinforcement to the Navy, as the production of the LN.401 was very slow.

Both used the type in combat during the Battle of France in ground attacks against German motorized columns and troop concentrations. Losses were heavy. One attack on 19 May resulted in the loss of 10 out of 20 dive bombers committed, while seven of the survivors were sufficiently damaged to be no longer airworthy. The production rate of the LN.401 and LN.411 was insufficient to replace losses, and in about a month of fighting the two squadrons lost two-thirds of their strength.

After the armistice with Germany, Loire-Nieuport dive bombers were retired from service and the two escadrilles were re-equipped with the Glenn-Martin 167-F level bomber.

Variants
Nieuport Ni.140
Original Nieuport design first flown on 12 March 1935. Renamed Loire-Nieuport LN.140 after the merger of Loire and Nieuport. Both prototypes lost by July 1936, when efforts were transferred to the improved LN.40. 
LN.40 
Pre-production aircraft. Seven built.
LN.41
Proposed land based LN.40
LN.401
Production single-seat carrier-based dive bomber. 15 built.
LN.411
Land-based 401, with naval equipment removed; 45 built.
LN.402 
One example fitted with a  Hispano-Suiza 12Y-31 engine.
LN.42
1940 development which dispensed with the inverted gull wing. Sole example used a  Hispano-Suiza 12Y-51 engine.

Operators

French Navy
French Air Force
Vichy French Air Force

Specifications (LN.401)

See also

References

Notes

Bibliography

External links

histaviation.com

1930s French bomber aircraft
Carrier-based aircraft
World War II dive bombers
LN.410
Inverted gull-wing aircraft
Single-engined tractor aircraft
Aircraft first flown in 1938